Nathaniel Pitcher (November 30, 1777 – May 25, 1836) was an American lawyer and politician who served as the eighth Governor of New York from February 11 to December 31, 1828.

Pitcher was born in Litchfield, Connecticut, and raised in Sandy Hill, New York (Hudson Falls).  He was educated in Sandy Hill, studied law, was admitted to the bar, and became an attorney.  He became active in politics as a Democratic-Republican, and served in local offices including town supervisor and justice of the peace.  He served in the New York State Assembly, as probate court judge of Washington County, and as a federal tax assessor during the War of 1812.  He was also a longtime veteran of the New York Militia; he served during the War of 1812, and after the war he commanded a brigade with the rank of brigadier general.

From 1819 to 1823, Pitcher was a member of the United States House of Representatives.  In 1826, he was elected Lieutenant Governor of New York.  He served in 1827 and early 1828, and succeeded to the governorship after the February 1828 death of DeWitt Clinton.  He served out the rest of Clinton's term, and left office after Martin Van Buren became governor in January 1829.  In 1830, Pitcher was again elected to Congress, and he served one term, 1831 to 1833.

Pitcher died in Sandy Hill on May 25, 1836, and was buried at Baker Cemetery in Hudson Falls.

Early life
Pitcher was born in Litchfield on November 30, 1777.  He was the son of Nathaniel Pitcher Sr. (1750–1802), a veteran of the American Revolution who led the detachment that captured Lake George's Fort George from the British in 1775.  The younger Pitcher was raised and educated in Sandy Hill, New York (now Hudson Falls).  He studied law, was admitted to the bar, and practiced in Sandy Hill.

Early career
Pitcher entered politics as a member of the Democratic-Republican Party, and he served as Kingsbury's town supervisor from 1804 to 1810.  He was a member of the New York State Assembly from 1806 to 1807, 1815 to 1816, and 1816 to 1818.

From 1812 to 1813, Pitcher served as surrogate judge of Washington County.  He was Kingsbury's town clerk in 1813 and 1814, and also served as a justice of the peace, with appointments in 1804, 1806, 1807, 1808, and 1811.  During the War of 1812, Pitcher was appointed the federal revenue assessor for the 10th District of New York, which included Washington County, and was responsible for collecting taxes imposed to support the war effort.

Military career
Pitcher's father had been active in the militia, and the younger Nathaniel Pitcher followed him into military service, receiving his commission as an ensign in 1802.  In 1808 he was appointed as adjutant of the regiment commanded by Micajah Pettit.  Later in 1808 he was promoted to major, and appointed as inspector of the brigade commanded by Warren Ferris.  In 1814, Pitcher was included in a militia detail of 13,500 soldiers that was activated for federal service during military operations on the Canada-western New York border during the War of 1812.

In 1815, Pitcher was appointed lieutenant colonel and second in command of the militia's 121st Regiment.  Later in 1815, he succeeded Pettit as commander of the 17th Brigade, and was promoted to brigadier general.  As a result of his military service, Pitcher was frequently referred to in public records and newspaper stories as "General Pitcher" or "Gen. Pitcher".

Later career
He was elected as a Democratic-Republican to the 16th and 17th Congresses (March 4, 1819 – March 3, 1823).  He was a delegate to the New York State Constitutional Convention in 1821.

Pitcher was Lieutenant Governor of New York in 1827 and 1828 and became Governor of New York upon the death of Governor DeWitt Clinton.  He completed Clinton's term, February 11, 1828, to December 31, 1828, and was succeeded by Martin Van Buren.

He was elected as a Jacksonian to the 22nd Congress (March 4, 1831 – March 3, 1833).

Death and burial
Pitcher died in Hudson Falls on May 25, 1836, and was buried at Baker Cemetery in Hudson Falls.

Family
Pitcher's first wife was Margaret Scott (1782–1815).  Their children included sons Augustus (1808–1876), Matthew Scott (1810–1858), and Montgomery Pike (1813–1841).

On March 15, 1823, Pitcher was married to Anna B. Merritt (1791–1824) of Freedom Plains, New York.  She became ill and died soon after giving birth to their son Edward Merritt (1824–1860).  Edward Merritt Pitcher moved to California in the 1840s, where he was an early settler of Sacramento, and a member of Sacramento County's first board of supervisors.

Pitcher's siblings included Zina Pitcher, a prominent physician and mayor of Detroit.

Legacy
The town of Pitcher in Chenango County is named for Pitcher.

Attempts to locate portrait
Pitcher is the only Governor of New York for whom no likeness is known to exist, and attempts to locate one have proved unsuccessful.  One image that is sometimes identified as a portrait of Pitcher is not his likeness, as the clothing worn by the subject and the facial hair clearly date it to the 1850s–1860s era, at least 20 years after Pitcher died.

References

Sources

Books

Newspapers

Magazines

Internet

External links

1777 births
1836 deaths
Governors of New York (state)
Lieutenant Governors of New York (state)
Members of the New York State Assembly
Democratic-Republican Party members of the United States House of Representatives from New York (state)
Jacksonian members of the United States House of Representatives from New York (state)
19th-century American politicians
Democratic-Republican Party state governors of the United States
Politicians from Litchfield, Connecticut
People from Kingsbury, New York
People from Hudson Falls, New York
Town supervisors in New York (state)
New York (state) state court judges
American militia generals
People from New York (state) in the War of 1812
Burials in New York (state)
Members of the United States House of Representatives from New York (state)